Scythris vernusella is a moth of the family Scythrididae. It was described by Eberhard Jäckh in 1978. It was described from the Elburz Mountains in northern Iran.

References

vernusella
Moths described in 1978